Trafalgar Castle School in Whitby, Ontario is an internationally known, independent day and boarding school for girls and young women in grades 4 through 12.  Boarding at the school begins in grade 7. Founded in 1874 as "Ontario Ladies' College", Trafalgar Castle School is one of the oldest independent schools in Canada and the second-oldest girls' school in Ontario.

History
The castle was built by Nelson Gilbert Reynolds, Sheriff of Ontario County, as a private residence in 1859. Reynolds was named after Lord Nelson and named his castle Trafalgar in honour of the Battle of Trafalgar.

The castle was the largest private dwelling in Canada until Casa Loma was built. It cost Reynolds $70,000, which was an exorbitant sum; a home at that time was built for $2,000, and a bank complete with vault could be built for $5,000 to $7,000. Reynolds was a colourful character and a gambling man, and indeed it was gambling losses that reportedly forced him to sell his beloved home to the Methodists in 1874 for the sum of $30,000.

The Methodists of that day were very interested in establishing higher learning institutions for young women. Rev. J. E. Sanderson convinced the Town of Whitby that this would be beneficial to its economy. James Holden, Esq. founder of the Dominion Bank, a local politician and businessman (with 5 daughters of his own) supported this idea. Sanderson and Holden were instrumental in raising the money and shares for the purchase of the castle and the establishment of Ontario Ladies' College.

Trafalgar Castle hosted its share of royalty and dignitaries through the years; both as Reynolds' residence, then as Ontario Ladies' College and now as Trafalgar Castle School.

Exterior shots of the building were used as "Collinwood" in the 2012 film Dark Shadows. The building has also appeared in other films such as The Vow, starring Channing Tatum, Detroit Rock City, Strike!, The Skulls, and I Shall Never Forget.

Student life

The school has approximately 240 day and boarding students; all girls from grade 4 to grade 12. Boarding students hail from many countries, including but not limited to Mexico, Korea, China, England, Spain, Nigeria, The Bahamas, Australia, New Zealand, Malaysia, Tajikistan, Jamaica, and Japan. While many boarders are international students, there are also domestic boarders from across Canada. The boarding program starts in grade 7. While the school was historically Methodist, students today are from all faiths and the school is considered non-denominational.

The current and 11th Head of School is Dr. Leanne Foster. She holds a BA from the University of Toronto, a B.Ed. and M.Ed. from the Ontario Institute for Studies in Education (OISE/UT), and a Ph.D. in Educational Administration from the University of Toronto. Dr. Foster assumed the role as Head of School in August 2015.

Athletics
Trafalgar has teams of various age levels in the following sports:
 Basketball - U20 - undefeated season 2010 and 2013
 Running Club
 Field hockey - U20 - CISAA champions 2019
 Ice hockey
 Soccer
 Rowing
 Swimming
 Track and Field
 Tennis
 Dance Pac
 Volleyball -U16-CISAA champions 2013 undefeated

Clubs
Trafalgar offers many after school clubs such as:
 FIRST Robotics Competition Team 1547
 FIRST LEGO League team
 S.M.A.T. (Science Math And Technology)
 Art With Heart
 Peer Mediation
 Reading Team
 The Castle Singers Choir
 Band
 Debating Society
 ACT Club (Active Citizenship Team)
 Eco Club
 Instrument Ensembles
 Archery Club
 Swimming Club

There are also two main leadership groups in the school, the Prefects (a group of 6-10 grade 12 students hand-selected through a rigorous application process) and the Trafalgar Athletics and Spirit Council, or TASC (a group of ten grade 11 students who function as the House Leaders).

Notable faculty
Reginald Bedford, pianist

See also
 Branksome Hall School
 St. Andrew's College
 St. Clement's School
 Crescent School
 St. Michael's College School
 Royal St. George's College
 Upper Canada College
 Havergal College
 Ridley College
 Lakefield College School
 CISAA

References

External links

Trafalgar Castle School
Trafalgar’s Robotics website – Team 1547
Alumnae Directory
Wedding Rentals
Historic Photos of Trafalgar Castle at Whitby Public Library and Archives Digital Photo Collection

Girls' schools in Canada
High schools in the Regional Municipality of Durham
Boarding schools in Ontario
Educational institutions established in 1874
Methodist schools
Private schools in Ontario
Preparatory schools in Ontario
Education in Whitby, Ontario
Christian schools in Canada
1874 establishments in Ontario
Girls boarding schools